In the 2020–21 season, Pogoń Szczecin competed in Ekstraklasa and this season's edition of the Polish Cup.

Players

Competitions

Ekstraklasa

Standings

Results summary

Matches

Polish Cup

References

Pogoń Szczecin
Pogoń Szczecin